Madiga Sacko is a rural commune and village in the Cercle of Diéma in the Kayes Region of western Mali. The commune includes the villages of Guédéguilé, Souranguédou and Bagamabougou as well as the main village (chef-lieu) of Madiga Sacko. In the 2009 census the commune had a population of 12,690.

References

Communes of Kayes Region